Since the establishment of the Africa Cup of Nations, Egypt has been a frequent participant, having played in 25 of 33 AFCON editions, the most of all participants in African history. The Egyptians won the inaugural 1957, and successfully defended it two years later. However, Egypt had to wait until 1986 to win it for the third time. During this era of early participation, Egypt frequently entered to the semi-finals and at least gained runners-up or third place. However, after 1986, Egypt would have a poor era from 1988 to 1996 when the team was knocked out from the group stage and quarter-finals. In 1998, Egypt successfully conquered its fourth trophy.

However, it was the 2000s that witnessed the most successful Egyptian side in AFCON, as Egypt won the tournament back to back from 2006 to 2010, expanding their result to seven, an African record. Egypt then missed three AFCON editions from 2012 to 2015, before returning in 2017 where the Pharaohs almost conquered its eighth title until losing to Cameroon 1–2 in the final.

Egypt is also the country that hosted the most AFCON editions, five times. Three of them ended with Egypt being crowned champions. The 2019 edition was hosted by Egypt, but the Pharaohs had a dismal performance, lost to South Africa, another former AFCON champion, 0–1, right at home turf in the round of sixteen in spite of three group stage wins. 

Egypt qualified for the 2021 Cameroon Africa Cup of Nations, the pharaohs' performance was much better than in 2019, the pharaohs almost secured their 8th AFCON trophy, and they reached the tournament’s Final but lost to Senegal 4-2 on penalties.

Overall record

Egypt's matches

Squads

References

External links
Africa Cup of Nations – Archives competitions – cafonline.com

 
Egypt national football team